Coptodisca lucifluella is a moth of the family Heliozelidae. It was described by James Brackenridge Clemens in 1860. It is found in North America, including Kentucky and Ohio.

The larvae feed on Carya illinoinensis. They mine the leaves of their host plant. The mine has the form of an oval blotch. Full-grown larvae chew the upper and lower leaf epidermis around the edges of the mine before pupating inside it.

References

Moths described in 1860
Heliozelidae